The prompter (French/German: souffleur; Italian: rammentatore, suggeritore) in an opera house gives the singers the opening words of each phrase a few seconds early. Prompts are mouthed silently or hurled lyrically in a half-voice, audible (hopefully) only on stage. (This is in contrast to the prompter in a theatre who aids actors who have forgotten their words or lines.)

Opera prompters are traditionally housed in a stuffy wooden box at the center-front edge of the stage, above the orchestra pit. They are visible to the performers and no one else. Technology has brought cool air and small display screens, among other advances, to support their work.

Effective prompting can be a challenge. The American prompter Philip Eisenberg recounted the story of a Maria Callas performance during which she needed louder prompts. The famed diva swooped down in a curtsy right in front of the prompter’s box and — mid-curtsy, unnoticed by the audience — gave the Italian command "più forte!" (louder) to her boxed colleague.

Prompters attend all rehearsals, mark up any adjustments or clarifications to the score, and generally "prepare" singers for a role. Their profile is low, and opera program books often credit them only under "musical preparation" or some similar moniker.

References
 

Opera terminology
Theatrical occupations